The Panzerkampfwagen I Ausf. C, also known as its prototype name VK 6.01, was a German light tank from the Second World War. Although the Panzer I Ausf. C was formally designated as a modification of the Panzer I, it was actually a completely new vehicle. This variant has little similarity with earlier Ausf. A and B variants - one of the main distinctions being the use of the Schachtellaufwerk inter-leaved track wheels which was used in many later German tanks during the war.

History
Development of Panzer I Ausf. C was started in the autumn of 1939 by Krauss-Maffei and Daimler-Benz on the instructions of the Wehrmacht to create a light airborne tank. From July to December 1942, 40 Panzer I Ausf. C units were produced (serial numbers 150101 - 150140), including 6 prototypes. Two tanks were deployed to the Panzer I Division.

Design

Armament 
The turret holds a 7.92 mm Mauser E.W. 141 semi-automatic anti-tank rifle, unique to this tank. The gun boasted a rate up to 100 rpm, but lacked in penetration. Although this tank proved to not be effective against similar armored tanks, it was proven to be able to clear small arms and halt defending forces amid Operation Barbarossa.

Notes

References
 
 

World War II tanks of Germany
Light tanks of Germany